Count Gergely Szilágyi (was born at the end of the 14th century), was a Hungarian  nobleman, member of the House of Szilágyi, uncle of Erzsébet Szilágyi and Michael Szilágyi.

Sources
Fraknói Vilmos: Michael Szilágyi, The uncle of King Matthias (Bp., 1913)
W.Vityi Zoltán: King Matthias maternal relatives
Felsőmagyarországi Minerva: nemzeti folyó-irás, Volumul 6

References 

Gergely
Hungarian nobility